The following is an outline of topics related to the Republic of Chile.

Chile
Chile
ISO 3166-1 alpha-2 country code for Chile: CL
ISO 3166-1 alpha-3 country code for Chile: CHL
ISO 3166-2:CL region codes for Chile

Archaeological sites of Chile
 Easter Island
 Monte Verde

Easter Island
 Aku-Aku
 Easter Island
 Hanga Roa
 Mataveri International Airport
 Music of Easter Island
 Rapa Nui (film)
 Rapa Nui National Park
 Rapa Nui language
 Rapanui
 Williamson-Balfour Company

Buildings and structures in Chile
 Bahá'í House of Worship
 Christ the Redeemer of the Andes
 Churches of Chiloé
 Costanera Center
 Cruz del Tercer Milenio
 Estación Mapocho
 Ex Congreso Nacional
 Humberstone and Santa Laura Saltpeter Works
 Casa de Isla Negra
 Morandé 80

Airports in Chile

Observatories in Chile

 Atacama Large Millimeter Array
 Atacama Pathfinder Experiment
 Atacama Submillimeter Telescope Experiment
 Birmingham Solar Oscillations Network
 Cerro Tololo Inter-American Observatory
 Cosmic Background Imager
 European Southern Observatory
 Gemini Observatory
 Giant Magellan Telescope
 La Silla Observatory
 Large Synoptic Survey Telescope
 Las Campanas Observatory
 Llano de Chajnantor Observatory
 Magellan telescopes
 Manuel Foster Observatory
 NANTEN2 Observatory
 Paranal Observatory
 SOAR telescope

Bridges in Chile
 Chacao Channel bridge

Cemeteries in Chile
 Cementerio General de Chile

Houses in Chile
 Guaraculén

Museums in Chile
 Huáscar (ship)

Sports venues in Chile
 Arena Santiago
 Estadio Víctor Jara
 Medialuna Monumental de Rancagua

Football venues in Chile
 Estadio Municipal de Calama
 Estadio Carlos Dittborn
 Estadio El Cobre
 Estadio El Teniente
 Estadio Fiscal
 Estadio Francisco Sánchez Rumoroso
 Estadio La Portada
 Estadio Las Higueras
 Estadio Monumental David Arellano
 Estadio Municipal de Concepción
 Estadio Municipal de La Florida
 Estadio Nacional de Chile
 Estadio Playa Ancha
 Estadio Regional de Antofagasta
 Estadio Regional de Chinquihue
 Estadio San Carlos de Apoquindo
 Estadio Santa Laura
 Estadio Santiago Bueras
 Estadio Sausalito

Settlements in Chile

Cities in Chile

 List of cities in Chile grouped by region, also largest cities
 Ancud, Chile
 Andacollo, Chile
 Angol, Chile
 Antofagasta, Chile
 Arica, Chile
 Lo Barnechea, Chile
 Batuco, Santiago
 El Bosque, Chile
 Calama, Chile
 Caldera, Chile
 Calera, La
 Cañete, Chile
 Castro, Chile
 Cerrillos, Chile
 Cerro Navia, Chile
 Chanco, Chile
 Chañaral, Chile
 Chile Chico, Chile
 Chillán, Chile
 La Cisterna, Chile
 Colbún, Chile
 Collipulli, Chile
 Concepción, Chile
 Conchalí, Chile
 Las Condes, Chile
 Constitución, Chile
 Copiapó, Chile
 Coquimbo, Chile
 Coronel, Chile
 Coyhaique, Chile
 Curepto, Chile
 Curicó, Chile
 Dalcahue, Chile
 Empedrado, Chile
 Lo Espejo, Chile
 Estación Central
 La Florida, Chile
 Frutillar, Chile
 Gran Valparaíso, Chile
 La Granja, Chile
 Huechuraba, Chile
 Illapel, Chile
 Independencia, Chile
 Iquique, Chile
 La Serena, Chile
 Licantén, Chile
 Linares, Chile
 Longaví, Chile
 Los Andes, Chile
 Los Ángeles, Chile
 Lota, Chile
 Macul, Chile
 Maipú, Chile
 Maule, Chile
 Mejillones, Chile
 Mulchén, Chile
 Nirivilo, Chile
 Ñuñoa, Chile
 Osorno, Chile
 Ovalle, Chile
 Parral, Chile
 Pedro Aguirre Cerda, Chile
 Pelarco, Chile
 Pelluhue, Chile
 Pencahue, Chile
 Penco, Chile
 Peñalolén, Chile
 La Pintana, Chile
 Lo Prado, Chile
 Porvenir
 Providencia, Chile
 Pucón, Chile
 Pudahuel, Chile
 Puerto Aisén, Chile
 Puerto Montt, Chile
 Puerto Natales, Chile
 Puerto Varas, Chile
 Punta Arenas, Chile
 Putre, Chile
 Quellón, Chile
 Quilicura, Chile
 Quillota, Chile
 Quilpué, Chile
 Quinta Normal, Chile
 Rancagua, Chile
 Rauco, Chile
 Recoleta, Chile
 La Reina, Chile
 Renaico, Chile
 Renca, Chile
 Rengo, Chile
 Retiro, Chile
 Romeral, Chile
 Río Claro, Chile
 Río Negro, Chile
 Saavedra, Chile
 Sagrada Familia (Chile)
 San Carlos, Chile
 San Clemente, Chile
 San Fabián de Alico
 San Fernando, Chile
 San Javier, Chile
 San Joaquín
 San Miguel (municipality)
 San Rafael, Chile
 San Ramón, Chile
 Santiago (municipality)
 Santo Domingo, Chile
 Sewell, Chile
 Talca
 Talcahuano
 Temuco
 Teno
 Tocopilla
 Valdivia (city)
 Vallenar
 Valparaíso
 Vichuquén
 Vicuña, Chile
 Villa Alegre, Chile
 Villarrica, Chile
 Viña del Mar
 Vitacura
 Yerbas Buenas

Santiago

 Santiago
 Lo Barnechea
 Barrio Bellavista
 Barrio Suecia
 Battle of Santiago
 Centro Cultural Palacio de La Moneda
 Cerrillos (municipality)
 Cerro Navia
 Cerro San Cristóbal
 Cerro Santa Lucía
 Club Deportivo Palestino
 Club Deportivo Universidad Católica
 Club de Deportes Santiago Morning
 Colo-Colo
 Conchalí
 El Bosque (municipality, Chile)
 Lo Espejo
 Estación Central railway station
 Estación Central
 Estadio Monumental David Arellano
 Estadio Nacional de Chile
 Estadio San Carlos de Apoquindo
 Estadio Santa Laura
 Estadio Santiago Bueras
 Estadio Víctor Jara
 Ex Congreso Nacional
 Huechuraba
 Independencia
 La Cisterna
 La Florida, Chile
 La Granja (municipality)
 La Pintana
 Las Condes
 Lo Prado
 Macul
 Maipú (municipality)
 Mapocho River
 Ñuñoa
 O'Higgins Park
 Palacio de La Moneda
 Pedro Aguirre Cerda (municipality)
 Peñalolén
 Providencia (municipality, Chile)
 Pudahuel
 Quilicura
 Quinta Normal
 Recoleta (municipality)
 La Reina
 Renca
 San Joaquín
 San Miguel (municipality)
 San Ramón, Chile
 Sanhattan
 Santiago (municipality)
 Santiago Metro
 Santiago Metropolitan Region
 Torre Entel
 Universidad Metropolitana de Ciencias de la Educación
 Universidad Tecnológica Metropolitana
 Universidad de Chile (football club)
 Universidad de los Andes (Chile)
 University of Santiago, Chile
 Universidad Catolica (football club)
 Unión Española
 Vitacura

People from Santiago

 Ricardo Acuña
 Xavier Castellà
 Jaime Fillol
 Fernando González
 Anita Lizana
 Marcelo Ríos
 Horatio Sanz
 Teresa of Los Andes
 Andrés Zaldívar
 Iván Zamorano

Towns in Chile
 Cerro Sombrero
 Colonia Dignidad
 Curanipe
 Guanaqueros
 Huara
 Lican Ray
 Parral
 Pica, Chile
 Pisco Elqui
 Puerto Edén
 Puerto Williams
 Puerto Toro
 Putagán
 San Gregorio, Chile
 San Pedro de Atacama
 Tongoy
 Villa Las Estrellas
 Villa Tehuelches

Communications in Chile
 Communications in Chile
 List of people on stamps of Chile
 .cl
 Time in Chile

Chilean culture
 Culture of Chile
 Chamanto
 Chilean rodeo
 Cueca
 Huaso
 List of Chilean chess champions
 Public holidays in Chile

Chilean art

Chilean artists
 Grupo Montparnasse
 Máximo Carvajal
 Felipe Barral Momberg

Chilean comics
 Condorito
 Cucalón (comic strip)

Chilean mythology
 City of the Caesars

Chilote mythology
 Caleuche
 Invunche
 Pincoya
 Trauco

Mapuche mythology
 Kalku
 Machi (Shaman)
 Nguruvilu

Rapa Nui mythology
 Hotu Matu'a
 Makemake (mythology)
 Manutara
 Moai
 Motu Nui
 Rongorongo
 Tangata manu

Chilean national symbols
 Coat of arms of Chile
 Flag of Chile
 National Anthem of Chile

Cinema of Chile
 ChilePuede
 Machuca
 Tony Manero (film)
 Pretendiendo

Chilean actors
 Antonio Prieto
 Cecilia Amenábar
 Patricio Contreras
 Cristián de la Fuente
 Christina Montt
 Leonor Varela
 Valentina Vargas

Chilean film directors
 Alejandro Amenábar
 Diego Barros
 Marco Bechis
 Juan Downey
 Alejandro Jodorowsky
 Miguel Littin
 Raoul Ruiz

Chilean films
 Kiltro
 Las películas de mi vida
 Machuca

Chilean screenwriters
 Marco Bechis
 Miguel Littin

Chilean cuisine
 See also Chilean cuisine
 Cuisine of Chile
 Anticuchos
 Asado
 Cazuela
 Charquicán
 Churrasco
 Curanto
 Empanada
 Humita
 Manjar blanco
 Sopaipilla

Chilean wine
 Chilean wine
 Carmenère
 Melchor de Concha y Toro
 Concha y Toro Winery

Languages of Chile
 Ayacucho Quechua
 Huillice language
 Kawésqar language
 Mapudungun
 Ona language
 Quechua
 Rapa Nui language
 Spanish language
 Tsesungun language
 Yaghan language

Indigenous languages of the South American Cone
 Kawésqar language
 Puelche
 Saraveca
 Yaghan language

Chilean literature
 The House of the Spirits
 La Araucana
 Papelucho

Chilean writers
 Isabel Allende
 Miguel Arteche
 Sergio Badilla Castillo
 Alberto Baeza Flores
 Eduardo Barrios
 Gregorio Billikopf
 Alberto Blest Gana
 Roberto Bolaño
 María Luisa Bombal
 Roberto Castillo Sandoval
 Jaime Collyer
 Francisco Coloane
 José Donoso
 Ariel Dorfman
 Jorge Edwards
 Diamela Eltit
 Alberto Fuguet
 Jorge González von Marées
 José Toribio Medina
 Gabriela Mistral
 Hernán Neira
 Carlos Pezoa Véliz
 Gonzalo Rojas
 Carlos Ruiz-Tagle
 Luis Sepúlveda
 Miguel Serrano
 Víctor Domingo Silva
 Antonio Skármeta
 Jorge Urrutia
 Matilde Urrutia

Chilean songwriters
 Víctor Jara
 Violeta Parra
 Eduardo Parra

Chilean music
 Music of Chile
 Chilean rock
 El Derecho de Vivir en Paz (album)
 Music of Easter Island
 Nueva canción
 Piedra roja

Nueva canción
 Nueva canción
 Basta (album)
 El Derecho de Vivir en Paz (album)
 El pueblo unido jamás será vencido
 La Población (album)
 Manifiesto (Víctor Jara album)
 Pongo En Tus Manos Abiertas (album)
 Víctor Jara (album)

Nueva canción musicians
 Eduardo Alquinta
 Eduardo Carrasco
 Eduardo Gatti
 Illapu
 Inti-Illimani
 Víctor Jara
 Los Jaivas
 Guillermo "Willy" Oddó
 Sergio Ortega
 Rodolfo Parada
 Violeta Parra
 Quilapayún

Chilean musicians
 Pablo Salvador Naranjo-Golborne

Chilean composers
 Luis Advis
 Gustavo Becerra-Schmidt
 Alfonso Leng
 Juan Orrego-Salas
 Sergio Ortega
 Jorge Peña Hen
 Jorge Urrutia

Chilean guitarists
 Oscar Lopez
 Margot Loyola
 Cristián Alvear Montecino

Chilean pianists

Chilean classical pianists
 Claudio Arrau
 Alberto Guerrero

Chilean singers
 German Casas
 Claudio Narea

Chilean classical singers
 Tito Beltrán
 Ramón Vinay
 Clorinda Corradi

Chilean folk singers
 Eduardo Alquinta
 Eduardo Carrasco
 Eduardo Gatti
 Víctor Jara
 Margot Loyola
 Mario Mutis
 Guillermo "Willy" Oddó
 Rodolfo Parada
 Parra family
 Claudio Parra
 Eduardo Parra
 Gabriel Parra
 Violeta Parra

Chilean popular singers
 Tom Araya
 Daniela Castillo
 Nicole
 Beto Cuevas
 Lucho Gatica
 Colombina Parra
 Javiera Parra
 Alejandro Silva (musician)

Chilean musical groups
 Chilean rock
 Gondwana (Chilean band)
 Hetroertzen
 Illapu
 Inti-Illimani
 Kudai
 La Ley (band)
 Lesbos in love
 Los Jaivas
 Los Miserables (band)
 Los Prisioneros
 Los Tetas
 Los Tres
 Lucybell
 Pyros
 Quilapayún
 Sol y Lluvia
 Vigilante (band)

Theatre in Chile

Chilean dramatists and playwrights

Economy of Chile
 Economy of Chile
 Chile under Pinochet
 Economic history of Chile
 Chilean escudo
 Miracle of Chile
 Chilean nationalization of copper
 Chilean peso
 Project Cybersyn
 Santiago Stock Exchange
 Trans-Pacific Strategic Economic Partnership
 US-Chile Free Trade Agreement
 Unidad de Fomento

Companies of Chile
 List of Chilean companies
 Antofagasta plc
 Codelco
 Copec
 Distribución y Servicio
 Entel
 Falabella
 LAN Airlines
 El Mercurio
 Sky Airline
 VTR Globalcom
 Vigatec (Chile)
 Williamson-Balfour Company

Mines in Chile
 Chuquicamata
 Escondida
 Radomiro Tomic (mine)
 El Teniente
 El Toqui mine

Trade unions of Chile
 Central Autónoma de Trabajadores
 Workers' United Center of Chile

Education in Chile
 List of universities in Chile
 Chile Student Strike of 2006
 Education in Chile
 2006 student protests in Chile
 2011 student protests in Chile
 Chilean Traditional Universities

Chilean educators

Chilean academics
 Gabriela Mistral

Chilean schoolteachers
 Gabriela Mistral

Schools in Chile
 Instituto Nacional
 Santiago College
 Nido de Aguilas
 The Mayflower School
 Saint George's College, Santiago
 Colegio de Nuestra Senora de Andacollo (Santiago)

Universities in Chile

 Central University of Chile
 Universidad Adolfo Ibáñez
 Universidad de Antofagasta
 Universidad de Chile (university)
 Universidad de Concepción
 Universidad Gabriela Mistral
 Universidad de La Frontera
 Universidad de La Serena
 Universidad de las Américas (Chile)
 Universidad de Los Lagos
 Universidad de Playa Ancha de Ciencias de la Educación
 Pontifical Catholic University of Chile
 Universidad San Sebastián
 University of Santiago, Chile
 Template:Chilean Traditional Universities
 Universidad Católica de Temuco
 Universidad Alberto Hurtado
 Universidad Arturo Prat
 Universidad Austral de Chile
 Universidad Católica de la Santísima Concepción
 Universidad Católica del Maule
 Universidad Católica del Norte
 Universidad Diego Portales
 Universidad Metropolitana de Ciencias de la Educación
 Universidad Tecnológica Metropolitana
 Universidad Tecnológica de Chile
 Universidad Técnica Federico Santa María
 Universidad de Artes, Ciencias y Comunicación
 Universidad de Atacama
 Universidad de Magallanes
 Universidad de Talca
 Universidad de Tarapacá
 Universidad de Valparaíso
 Universidad de los Andes (Chile)
 Universidad del Bío-Bío
 Universidad Técnica Federico Santa María
 Pontifical Catholic University of Valparaíso

Environment of Chile

Biota of Chile

Fauna of Chile

 Alpaca
 Andean cat
 Andean condor
 Andean tinamou
 Black-necked swan
 Chilean dolphin
 Chilean flamingo
 Chilean horse
 Coscoroba swan
 Culpeo
 Darwin's fox
 Common degu
 Elegant crested tinamou
 Emperor penguin
 Flying steamer duck
 Geoffroy's cat
 Green-backed firecrown
 Guanaco
 Haig's tuco-tuco
 Huemul (zoology)
 Humboldt penguin
 James's flamingo
 Kelp goose
 King penguin
 Kodkod
 Long-nosed shrew opossum
 Macaroni penguin
 Magellanic penguin
 Monito del monte
 Pampas cat
 Pampas fox
 Pudú
 Puna tinamou
 Sechura fox
 Short-eared dog
 South American sea lion
 South American gray fox
 Torrent duck
 Vampire bat
 Vicuña

Flora of Chile

 Aextoxicon
 Antarctic flora
 Araucaria
 Araucaria araucana
 Austrocedrus
 Berberis buxifolia
 Berberis darwinii
 Berberis negeriana
 Boldo
 Chilean Matorral
 Coihue
 Copihue
 Drimys
 Eucryphia
 Fitzroya
 Francoaceae
 Gomortega
 Juan Fernández Islands
 Lardizabala
 Lenga beech
 Luma apiculata
 Luma chequen
 Magellanic subpolar forests
 Mitraria
 Myrceugenia
 Nolana
 Nothofagus
 Nothofagus antarctica
 Pilgerodendron
 Podocarpus nubigenus
 Prumnopitys andina
 Saxegothaea
 Soap bark tree
 Solanum crispum
 Tetragonia
 Ugni
 Valdivian temperate rain forests
 Yareta

Conservation in Chile

World Heritage Sites in Chile
 Churches of Chiloé
 Easter Island
 Humberstone and Santa Laura Saltpeter Works
 Sewell, Chile
 Valparaíso

Ecoregions in Chile
 Atacama
 Chilean Matorral
 Desventuradas Islands
 Juan Fernández Islands
 Magellanic subpolar forests
 Valdivian temperate rain forests

Natural history of Chile

Geography of Chile

 Geography of Chile
 Altiplano
 Azapa Valley
 Chilean Central Valley
 Darwin Sound
 El Tatio
 Extreme points of Chile
 Guanaqueros
 Gulf of Ancud
 Gulf of Corcovado
 Huinay
 ISO 3166-2:CL
 Intermediate Depression
 La Portada
 Lauca
 List of Biosphere Reserves in Chile
 Los Ruiles
 Peru–Chile Trench
 Puerto del Hambre
 Pumalín Park
 Tongoy, Chile
 Valdivian Coastal Range

Craters of Chile
 Monturaqui crater

Deserts of Chile
 Atacama

Glaciers of Chile
 Brüggen Glacier
 Northern Patagonian Ice Field
 San Quintín Glacier
 San Rafael Glacier
 Southern Patagonian Ice Field

Headlands of Chile
 False Cape Horn
 Cape Froward
 Cape Horn

Islands of Chile
 Isla Chañaral
 Chiloé Island
 Chonos Archipelago
 Dawson Island
 Desventuradas Islands
 Diego Ramírez Islands
 Easter Island
 Guafo Island
 Guayaneco Archipelago
 Hermite Islands
 Hoste (island)
 Ildefonso Islands
 Mocha (island)
 Isla Navarino
 Picton, Lennox and Nueva
 Riesco Island
 Sala y Gómez
 Santa Inés
 Tierra del Fuego
 Isla Grande de Tierra del Fuego
 Wellington Island

Chiloé Island
 Chiloé Island
 Chiloé Province

Juan Fernández Islands
 Juan Fernández Islands
 Alejandro Selkirk Island
 Robinson Crusoe Island
 Santa Clara (Juan Fernández Islands)

Lakes of Chile
 Lake Chungará
 Fagnano Lake
 Buenos Aires/General Carrera Lake
 Lake Llanquihue
 O'Higgins/San Martín Lake
 Lake Villarrica

Maps of Chile

Mountains of Chile

 Acotango
 Cerro Azul (Chile volcano)
 Cerro Bayo
 Cerro Chaltén
 Copahue
 Cordillera de Talinay
 Cordillera del Paine
 Cordón del Azufre
 Mount Darwin (Andes)
 Cerro Escorial
 Falso Azufre
 Mount Hudson
 Irruputuncu
 Sierra Nevada de Lagunas Bravas
 Lanin
 Lascar Volcano
 Lastarria
 Lautaro (volcano)
 Licancabur
 Llullaillaco
 Maipo (volcano)
 Marmolejo
 Cerro Minchincha
 Sierra Nevada (stratovolcano)
 Nevado de Longaví
 Ojos del Salado
 Olca
 Volcán Osorno
 Cerro Paranal
 Parinacota Volcano
 Paruma
 Pomerape
 Robledo (volcano)
 Monte San Valentin
 Socompa
 Cerro Torre
 Tronador
 Tupungato
 Villarrica (volcano)

National parks of Chile
 List of national parks of Chile
 Alberto de Agostini National Park
 Alerce Andino National Park
 Archipiélago de Juan Fernández National Park
 Bernardo O'Higgins National Park
 Bosque de Fray Jorge National Park
 Cabo de Hornos National Park
 Conguillío National Park
 Cordillera del Paine
 Isla Magdalena National Park
 La Campana National Park
 Laguna San Rafael National Park
 Lauca National Park
 Pali-Aike National Park
 Queulat National Park
 Rapa Nui National Park
 Vicente Pérez Rosales National Park

Patagonia
 Patagonia
 City of the Caesars
 Lake Huechulafquen
 Patagonian Ice Sheet
 In Patagonia
 Kingdom of Araucania and Patagonia
 Patagon
 Tehuelche people

Peninsulas of Chile
 Arauco Peninsula
 Brunswick Peninsula
 Hardy Peninsula
 Mejillones Peninsula
 Taitao Peninsula

Rivers of Chile

 Achibueno
 Aconcagua River
 Ancoa
 Baker River (Chile)
 Bío-Bío River
 Cauquenes river
 Cautín River
 Elqui River
 Futaleufú River
 Itata River
 Laja River (Chile)
 Loa River
 Loncomilla River
 Longaví River
 Mapocho River
 Mataquito River
 Maule river
 Pascua River
 Perquilauquén
 Puelo River
 River Melado
 River Purapel
 River Putagán
 Valdivia River

Ski areas and resorts in Chile
 Antillanca
 Coyhaique
 Valle Nevado
 Pucón
 Termas de Chillán

Straits of Chile
 Beagle Channel
 Chacao Channel
 Darwin Sound
 Drake Passage
 Moraleda Channel
 Strait of Magellan

Chile geography stubs

 Achibueno
 Aconcagua River
 Alameda del Libertador Bernardo O'Higgins
 Alberto de Agostini National Park
 Alto Hospicio
 Ancoa
 Ancud
 Andacollo
 Angol
 Antillanca
 Antofagasta Province
 Araucanía Region
 Arauco Province
 Archipiélago de Juan Fernández National Park
 Arica Province
 Arica and Parinacota Region
 Atacama Department
 Atacama Region
 Aisén Fjord
 Aisén Region
 Baker River (Chile)
 Barrio Suecia
 Batuco, Santiago
 Bernardo O'Higgins National Park
 Biobío Province
 Brunswick Peninsula
 Brüggen Glacier
 Buenos Aires/General Carrera Lake
 Bío-Bío Region
 Bío-Bío River
 Cabo de Hornos Biosphere Reserve
 Cabo de Hornos National Park
 Calama, Chile
 Caldera, Chile
 Cape Froward
 Casa de Isla Negra
 Castro, Chile
 Cauquenes
 Cauquenes Province
 Cauquenes river
 Cautín Province
 Cautín River
 Cañete
 Cementerio General de Chile
 Cerrillos (municipality)
 Cerro Azul (Chile volcano)
 Cerro Bayo
 Cerro Escorial
 Cerro Navia
 Cerro Paranal
 Cerro San Cristóbal
 Cerro Torre
 Chacao Channel
 Chañaral
 Chile Chico
 Chilean Sea
 Chiloé Province
 Chimbarongo
 Chonos Archipelago
 Churches of Chiloé
 Cochrane, Chile
 Colchagua Province
 Colina, Chile
 Combarbala
 Conchalí
 Constitución, Chile
 Copahue
 Copiapó
 Coquimbo
 Coquimbo Region
 Cordillera Province, Chile
 Cordillera de Talinay
 Cordón del Azufre
 Coronel, Chile
 Curepto
 Curicó Province
 Dalcahue
 Dawson Island
 El Bosque (municipality, Chile)
 El Monte (Chile)
 Elqui River
 Empedrado, Talca
 Escondida
 Estación Central
 Fagnano Lake
 False Cape Horn
 Falso Azufre
 Frutillar
 Futaleufú River
 Gran Valparaíso, Chile
 Guafo Island
 Guanaqueros
 Guayaneco Archipelago
 Gulf of Ancud
 Gulf of Corcovado
 Hanga Roa
 Hardy Peninsula
 Hermite Islands
 Hoste (island)
 Huara
 Huechuraba
 Illapel
 Independencia (municipality, Chile)
 Iquique
 Iquique Province
 Isla Chañaral
 Isla Grande de Tierra del Fuego
 Itata River
 La Campana National Park
 La Campana-Peñuelas
 La Cisterna
 La Dehesa
 La Florida, Chile
 La Granja (municipality)
 La Pintana
 La Reina
 Laguna San Rafael National Park
 Laguna Verde, Chile
 Laja Falls
 Laja River (Chile)
 Lake Ballivián
 Lake Chungará
 Lake Llanquihue
 Lake Villarrica
 Lampa, Chile
 Lanin
 Las Condes
 Lascar Volcano
 Lastarria
 Lauca
 Lauca National Park
 Lautaro (volcano)
 Lican Ray, Chile
 Licancabur
 Licantén
 Linares Province
 Llanquihue Province
 Lo Barnechea
 Lo Espejo
 Lo Prado
 Loncomilla River
 Longaví
 Longaví River
 Los Andes, Chile
 Los Lagos Region
 Los Ruiles
 Los Vilos
 Los Ángeles
 Lota, Chile
 Macul
 Maipo (volcano)
 Maipo Province
 Maipú (municipality)
 Malleco Province
 Mapocho River
 Marmolejo
 Mataquito River
 Maule (Chile)
 Maule river
 Mejillones
 Mocha (island)
 Monte San Valentin
 Monte Verde
 Monturaqui crater
 Moraleda Channel
 Motu Nui
 Mulchén
 Northern Patagonian Ice Field
 O'Higgins Region
 O'Higgins/San Martín Lake
 Ojos del Salado
 Osorno Province
 Osorno, Chile
 Ovalle, Chile
 Palena Province
 Pali-Aike National Park
 Pali-Aike Volcanic Field
 Paranal Mountain
 Parinacota, Chile
 Parinacota Province
 Parral, Chile
 Paso Libertadores
 Pedro Aguirre Cerda (municipality)
 Pelarco
 Pencahue
 Penco
 Perquilauquén
 Peru–Chile Trench
 Peñalolen
 Peñalolén
 Pica, Chile
 Pichidangui
 Picton, Lennox and Nueva
 Pisagua, Chile
 Pisco Elqui, Chile
 Pomerape
 Pozo Almonte
 Providencia (municipality, Chile)
 Province of Los Andes, Chile

Subdivisions of Chile
 Electoral division of Chile
 Municipalities of Chile
 Provinces of Chile
 Regions of Chile

Tierra del Fuego
 Tierra del Fuego
 Alacalufe people
 Beagle Channel
 Darwin Sound
 Fagnano Lake
 Isla Grande de Tierra del Fuego
 Isla Navarino
 Kawésqar language
 Mount Darwin (Andes)
 Saraveca language
 Selknam
 Tierra del Fuego Province, Chile
 Yaghan language

Cities and towns in Tierra del Fuego
 Isla Navarino
 Porvenir, Chile
 Puerto Toro
 Puerto Williams

Volcanoes of Chile

 Acotango
 Cerro Azul (Chile volcano)
 Cerro Bayo
 Calbuco (volcano)
 Chaiten
 Copahue
 Cordón del Azufre
 Cerro Escorial
 Falso Azufre
 Hornopirén
 Mount Hudson
 Irruputuncu
 Sierra Nevada de Lagunas Bravas
 Lanin
 Lascar Volcano
 Lastarria
 Lautaro (volcano)
 Licancabur
 Llullaillaco
 Maipo (volcano)
 Cerro Minchincha
 Sierra Nevada (stratovolcano)
 Nevados de Payachata
 Nevados de Quimsachata
 Ojos del Salado
 Olca
 Volcán Osorno
 Pali-Aike Volcanic Field
 Parinacota Volcano
 Paruma
 Pomerape
 Robledo (volcano)
 Socompa
 Villarrica (volcano)
 Wallatiri
 Yaté

Waterfalls of Chile
 Laja Falls

Government of Chile
 Carabineros de Chile
 Chamber of Deputies of Chile
 Constitution of Chile
 Ministry of Foreign Affairs of Chile
 Government Junta of Chile (1973)
 National Congress of Chile
 National Women's Service
 Royal Audiencia of Concepción
 Royal Audiencia of Santiago
 Ministry General Secretariat of Government
 Senate of Chile
 Supreme Court of Chile

Foreign relations of Chile
 List of Ambassadors from New Zealand to Chile
 Beagle conflict
 Papal mediation in the Beagle conflict
 Beagle Channel Arbitration
 Direct negotiations between Chile and Argentina in 1977-78
 Papal mediation in the Beagle conflict
 Treaty of Peace and Friendship of 1984 between Chile and Argentina
 Beagle Channel cartography since 1881

Chilean diplomats
 Jorge Edwards
 Gabriela Mistral
 Pablo Neruda

Official residences in Chile
 Palacio de La Moneda

Health in Chile
 List of hospitals in Chile

History of Chile

 History of Chile
 Alejandrina Cox incident
 Alessandri family
 Allende stamps
 Alto de la Alianza
 Antonio Samoré
 Arauco War
 Army of the Andes
 Slit Throats Case
 Burnt Alive Case
 Captaincy General of Chile
 Caravan of Death
 Carrera family
 Chicago Boys
 Chile under Allende
 Chile under Pinochet
 1891 Chilean Civil War
 Chilean Revolution of 1829
 Chilean coup of 1973
 Chilean political scandals
 City of the Caesars
 Colonia Dignidad
 Operation Condor
 Covadonga (ship)
 Crossing of the Andes
 DINA
 Economic history of Chile
 Erasmo Escala
 Esmeralda (BE-43)
 Pedro Espinoza Bravo
 Estadio Nacional de Chile
 Estadio Víctor Jara
 Forced disappearance
 Frei family
 1992 Galvarino
 List of Government Juntas of Chile
 Charles Horman
 Huaso (horse)
 Juntas de Abastecimientos y Precios
 Kingdom of Araucania and Patagonia
 Liberal-Conservative Fusion (Chile)
 Maitland Plan
 Mapuche
 Massacre of Seguro Obrero
 Miracle of Chile
 Missing (1982 film)
 Montt family
 National Party (Chile)
 Chilean nationalization of copper
 Nueva Extremadura
 Operation Colombo
 President of Chile
 Project Cybersyn
 Project FUBELT
 Rettig Report
 Royal Governor of Chile
 Santiago meteorite
 Paul Schäfer
 Schneider Doctrine
 Scorpion scandal
 Inés Suárez
 Tanquetazo
 Timeline of Chilean history
 Operation TOUCAN (KGB)
 Michael Townley
 Pedro de Valdivia
 Valech Report
 Valparaiso bombardment
 Villa Grimaldi

Elections in Chile

 Elections in Chile
 Chilean National Plebiscite, 1980
 2005 Chilean parliamentary election
 1826 Chilean presidential election
 1827 Chilean presidential election
 1829 Chilean presidential election
 1831 Chilean presidential election
 1836 Chilean presidential election
 1841 Chilean presidential election
 1846 Chilean presidential election
 1851 Chilean presidential election
 1856 Chilean presidential election
 1861 Chilean presidential election
 1866 Chilean presidential election
 1871 Chilean presidential election
 1876 Chilean presidential election
 1881 Chilean presidential election
 1886 Chilean presidential election
 July 1891 Chilean presidential election
 October 1891 Chilean presidential election
 1896 Chilean presidential election
 1901 Chilean presidential election
 1906 Chilean presidential election
 1920 Chilean presidential election
 1925 Chilean presidential election
 1927 Chilean presidential election
 1931 Chilean presidential election
 1932 Chilean presidential election
 1938 Chilean presidential election
 1942 Chilean presidential election
 1946 Chilean presidential election
 1952 Chilean presidential election
 1958 Chilean presidential election
 1964 Chilean presidential election
 1970 Chilean presidential election
 1989 Chilean presidential election
 1993 Chilean presidential election
 1999–2000 Chilean presidential election
 2005–06 Chilean presidential election
 2009–10 Chilean presidential election

Wars of Chile
 Arauco War
 War of the Confederation
 1891 Chilean Civil War
 Chincha Islands War
 Chilean Independence
 War of the Pacific

War of the Pacific
 War of the Pacific
 Antofagasta Region
 Arica, Chile
 Atacama border dispute
 BAP Atahualpa
 Biblioteca Nacional del Perú
 Covadonga (ship)
 Ferrocarril de Antofagasta a Bolivia
 Huáscar (ship)
 BAP Manco Cápac
 Tacna
 Tacna-Arica compromise
 Tarapacá Region
 Toro Submarino
 Treaty of Ancón

Battles of the War of the Pacific
 Battle of Arica
 Bombardment of Callao
 Battle of Huamachuco
 Battle of Pisagua
 Battle of San Francisco
 Battle of Tarapacá
 Battle of Topáter

Naval battles of the War of the Pacific
 Battle of Angamos
 Battle of Chipana
 Battle of Iquique
 Battle of Punta Gruesa

War of the Pacific people

 Eduardo Abaroa
 Francisco Bolognesi
 Manuel Baquedano
 Alberto Blest Gana
 Mariano Bustamante
 Ladislao Cabrera
 Andrés Avelino Cáceres
 Narciso Campero
 Ignacio Carrera Pinto
 Melitón Carvajal
 Hilarión Daza
 Abel-Nicolas Bergasse du Petit-Thouars
 Erasmo Escala
 Miguel Grau Seminario
 Pedro Lagos
 Juan José Latorre
 Patricio Lynch
 Lizardo Montero Flores
 Nicolás de Piérola
 Aníbal Pinto
 Mariano Ignacio Prado
 Arturo Prat
 Roque Sáenz Peña
 Domingo Santa María
 Robert Souper
 Alfonso Ugarte
 Juan Williams Rebolledo

Battles of Chile
 Battle of Arica
 Bombardment of Callao
 First Battle of Cancha Rayada
 Second Battle of Cancha Rayada
 Battle of Chacabuco
 Disaster of Curalaba
 Battle of Huamachuco
 Battle of Maipú
 Battle of the Maule
 Battle of Pisagua
 Disaster of Rancagua
 Battle of San Francisco
 Battle of Tarapacá
 Battle of Topáter
 Battle of Tucapel
 Battle of Yungay

Battles of the Chilean War of Independence
 First Battle of Cancha Rayada
 Second Battle of Cancha Rayada
 Battle of Chacabuco
 Battle of Maipú
 Disaster of Rancagua

Battles of the Chincha Islands War

Battles of the War of the Confederation
 Battle of Yungay

Battles of the Arauco War
 Disaster of Curalaba
 Battle of Tucapel

Naval battles of Chile
 Battle of Papudo

Naval battles of the Chincha Islands War
 Battle of Abtao
 Battle of Callao
 Battle of Papudo

War of the Confederation
 War of the Confederation
 Republic of North Peru
 Republic of South Peru
 Peru-Bolivian Confederation

War of the Confederation people
 José Ballivián
 Manuel Blanco Encalada
 Manuel Bulnes
 Ramón Castilla
 Agustín Gamarra
 Luis José de Orbegoso
 Candelaria Perez
 Diego Portales
 José Joaquín Prieto
 José de la Riva Agüero
 Andrés de Santa Cruz
 Robert Winthrop Simpson

War of Chilean independence
 Chilean Independence
 The Road to Maipo

Chilean War of Independence people
 Javiera Carrera
 José Miguel Carrera
 Luis Carrera
 Thomas Cochrane, 10th Earl of Dundonald
 Ramón Freire
 Francisco de la Lastra
 Juan Mackenna
 Casimiro Marcó del Pont
 Rafael Maroto/Translation
 Juan Martinez de Rozas
 Bernardo O'Higgins
 Mariano Osorio
 Antonio Pareja
 Manuel Rodríguez
 José de San Martín
 Mateo de Toro y Zambrano

Chincha Islands War
 Covadonga (ship)
 Valparaiso bombardment

Chincha Islands War people
 Manuel Blanco Encalada
 Pedro Diez Canseco
 Mariano Melgarejo
 Casto Méndez Núñez
 Lizardo Montero Flores
 Leopoldo O'Donnell, 1st Duke of Tetuan
 Juan Manuel Pareja
 José Joaquín Pérez
 Juan Antonio Pezet
 Mariano Ignacio Prado
 Ramón María Narváez y Campos, 1st Duke of Valencia
 Manuel Ignacio de Vivanco
 Juan Williams Rebolledo

Arauco War
 Arauco War

Arauco War people
 Alonso de Ercilla y Zúñiga
 García Hurtado de Mendoza, Marquis of Cañete
 Lautaro (toqui)
 Pedro de Valdivia

Operation Condor

 Operation Condor
 Alianza Americana Anticomunista
 Alianza Anticomunista Argentina
 Martín Almada
 Augusto Pinochet's arrest and trial
 Batallón de Inteligencia 601
 Orlando Bosch
 Caravan of Death
 Colonia Dignidad
 Coordination of United Revolutionary Organizations
 DINA
 Stefano Delle Chiaie
 John Dinges
 Dirección de los Servicios de Inteligencia y Prevención
 Pedro Espinoza Bravo
 Forced disappearance
 Eduardo Frei Montalva
 Juan Guzmán Tapia
 Henry Kissinger
 Ed Koch
 Peter Kornbluh
 Saul Landau
 Bernardo Leighton
 Orlando Letelier
 José López Rega
 Kenneth Maxwell
 Montoneros
 Operation Colombo
 Operation TOUCAN (KGB)
 Augusto Pinochet
 Luis Posada Carriles
 Carlos Prats
 Otto Reich
 Rettig Report
 Virgilio Paz Romero
 SISMI
 Paul Schäfer
 Strategy of tension
 Alfredo Stroessner
 Terror archives
 Juan José Torres
 Michael Townley
 Valech Report
 Cyrus Vance
 Jorge Rafael Videla
 Villa Grimaldi
 Western Hemisphere Institute for Security Cooperation
 Robert White (ambassador)

History of the foreign relations of Chile
 ABC Powers
 Treaty of Peace and Friendship of 1984 between Chile and Argentina
 Atacama border dispute
 Augusto Pinochet's arrest and trial
 Baltimore Crisis
 Beagle conflict
 Chilean nationalization of copper
 Foreign relations of Chile
 Joel Roberts Poinsett
 Tacna-Arica compromise
 Treaty of Ancón
 United States intervention in Chile

Colonial Chile
 Francisco de Aguirre (conquistador)
 Diego de Almagro
 Lorenzo de Arrau
 Caupolican
 Colocolo (tribal chief)
 Catalina de Erauso
 Alonso de Ercilla y Zúñiga
 Alonso García de Ramón
 García Hurtado de Mendoza, 5th Marquis of Cañete
 Lautaro (toqui)
 Francisco López de Zúñiga
 Francisco Maldonado da Silva
 Luis Merlo de la Fuente
 Michimalonco
 Juan Ignacio Molina
 Ambrosio O'Higgins, Marquis of Osorno
 Domingo Ortiz de Rosas
 Mariano Osorio
 Rodrigo de Quiroga
 Alonso de Ribera
 Martín Ruiz de Gamboa
 Inés Suárez
 Pedro de Valdivia
 Francisco de Villagra
 Pedro de Villagra

Disasters in Chile

Earthquakes in Chile

Maps of the history of Chile
 Maps of Chile

Chilean law
 Gay rights in Chile

Chile-related lists
 List of cities in Chile
 List of Chilean Flags
 List of Chilean freeways
 List of hospitals in Chile
 List of ecoregions in Chile
 List of Chilean magazines
 List of national parks of Chile
 List of Chilean newspapers
 List of political parties in Chile
 List of people on stamps of Chile
 Timeline of Chilean history
 List of Government Juntas of Chile

Chilean media
.cl Internet country code top-level domain for Chile
 Informe Especial
 List of Chilean magazines
 List of Chilean newspapers
 Sábado Gigante

Newspapers published in Chile
 List of Chilean newspapers
 The Clinic
 La Cuarta
 El Siglo (Chile)
 Fortín Mapocho
 El Mercurio
 La Prensa de Curicó
 La Segunda
 La Tercera
 Las Últimas Noticias

Radio stations in Chile
 Radio Cooperativa

Television stations in Chile
 List of Chilean television channels
 ARTV (Chile)
 Canal del Fútbol (Chile)
 CDtv
 Canal 13 (Chile)
 Chilevisión
 Etc...TV
 Óptima Televisión
 Red Televisiva Megavisión
 Compañía Chilena de Televisión
 TV Chile
 TV Senado
 TVN (Chile)
 TVU
 UCV TV
 Telecanal
 Via X
 Zona Latina

Military of Chile
 Military of Chile
 Chilean Air Force
 Chilean Army
 Carabineros de Chile
 Halcones
 Chilean Navy
 Unidad Anti-Terrorista

Chilean military personnel

Chilean military officers
 Ignacio Carrera Pinto
 Luis Carrera
 Pedro Espinoza Bravo
 Dagoberto Godoy
 Alberto Larraguibel
 Francisco de la Lastra
 Juan Mackenna
 Arturo Prat
 Manuel Rodríguez
 Robert Souper
 Roberto Souper
 José Antonio Vidaurre
 Klaus von Storch

Chilean generals
 Luis Altamirano
 Alberto Bachelet
 Manuel Baquedano
 Bartolomé Blanche
 Manuel Bulnes
 Julio Canessa
 José Miguel Carrera
 Juan Emilio Cheyre
 Manuel Contreras
 Erasmo Escala
 Ramón Freire
 Marmaduque Grove
 Carlos Ibáñez del Campo
 Miguel Krasnoff
 Pedro Lagos
 Gustavo Leigh
 Fernando Matthei
 César Mendoza
 Bernardo O'Higgins
 Guillermo Pickering
 Augusto Pinochet
 Francisco Antonio Pinto
 Carlos Prats
 José Joaquín Prieto
 René Schneider
 Rodolfo Stange
 Camilo Valenzuela
 Roberto Viaux

Chilean admirals
 Manuel Blanco Encalada
 Juan José Latorre
 Patricio Lynch
 José Toribio Merino
Raúl Montero
 Jorge Montt
 Francisco Nef
 Robert Winthrop Simpson
 Juan Williams Rebolledo

Chilean military enlisted personnel
 Candelaria Perez

Military equipment of Chile

Chilean military aircraft

Chilean military aircraft 1990-1999

Chilean fighter aircraft 1990-1999
 ENAER Pantera

Chilean fighter aircraft

Naval ships of Chile

 Almirante Condell 3
 Almirante Lynch 3
 
 Covadonga (ship)
 Huáscar (ship)
 Chilean destroyer Ministro Portales
 O'Higgins (frigate)

World War I naval ships of Chile

World War I destroyers of Chile
 Almirante Condell
 Almirante Lynch

World War II naval ships of Chile

World War II battleships of Chile
 Chilean battleship Almirante Latorre

World War II destroyers of Chile
 Chilean destroyer Aldea (1928)
 Almirante Condell
 Almirante Lynch
 Serrano class destroyer

Cold War naval ships of Chile

Cold War battleships of Chile
 Chilean battleship Almirante Latorre

Battleships of Chile
 Chilean battleship Almirante Latorre

Cruisers of Chile

Destroyers of Chile
 
 
 
 Chilean destroyer Ministro Portales

World War II military equipment of Chile

Chilean people

 Clarence Acuña
 Luis Advis
 Carolina Aguilera
 Memo Aguirre
 Pedro Aguirre Cerda
 Marlene Ahrens
 Arturo Alessandri
 Jorge Alessandri
 Isabel Allende Bussi
 Andrés Pascal Allende
 Isabel Allende
 Salvador Allende
 Clodomiro Almeyda
 Eduardo Alquinta
 Carlos Altamirano
 Luis Altamirano
 Cristián Andrés Álvarez Valenzuela
 Anacleto Angelini
 Tom Araya
 Claudio Arrau
 Lorenzo de Arrau
 Alberto Bachelet
 Michelle Bachelet
 Sergio Badilla Castillo
 Alberto Baeza Flores
 José Manuel Balmaceda
 Manuel Baquedano
 Rodrigo Barrera
 Claudio Barrientos
 Eduardo Barrios
 Diego Barros Arana
 Ramón Barros Luco
 Diego Barros
 Gustavo Becerra-Schmidt
 Marco Bechis
 Andrés Bello
 Tito Beltrán
 Gregorio Billikopf
 Bartolomé Blanche
 Manuel Blanco Encalada
 Roberto Bolaño
 Cecilia Bolocco
 María Luisa Bombal
 Erik Bongcam-Rudloff
 Hans Braumüller
 Manuel Bulnes
 Claudio Bunster
 Carlos Camus
 Julio Canessa
 Eduardo Carrasco
 Ignacio Carrera Pinto
 Javiera Carrera
 José Miguel Carrera
 Luis Carrera
 Máximo Carvajal
 Xavier Castellà
 Daniela Castillo
 Roberto Castillo Sandoval
 Carlos Catasse
 Caupolican
 Juan Emilio Cheyre
 Elicura Chihuailaf
 Abdón Cifuentes
 S. Cofre
 Francisco Coloane
 Colocolo (tribal chief)
 Manuel Contreras
 Patricio Contreras
 Luis Corvalán
 Carlos Dávila
 Trini Decombe
 Paul Delano
 Patricia Demick
 Juan Downey
 Luisa Durán
 Jorge Edwards
 Francisco Antonio Encina
 Miguel Enríquez Espinosa
 Francisco Javier Errázuriz Ossa
 Eugenia Errázuriz
 Federico Errázuriz Zañartu
 Fernando Errázuriz Aldunate
 Francisco Javier Errázuriz Talavera
 Alejandro Escalona
 Pedro Espinoza Bravo
 Jéssica Eterovic
 Agustín Eyzaguirre
 Elías Figueroa
 Emiliano Figueroa Larraín
 Fernando Flores
 Don Francisco (television host)
 Eduardo Frei Montalva
 Eduardo Frei Ruiz-Tagle
 Cristián de la Fuente
 Alberto Fuguet
 Lucho Gatica
 Eduardo Gatti
 Hans Gildemeister
 Arturo Godoy
 Dagoberto Godoy
 Eric Goles
 Gabriel González Videla
 Fernando González
 Marmaduque Grove
 Juan Guzmán Tapia
 Lucía Hiriart de Pinochet
 Tomás Hirsch
 Brenda Hughes
 Vicente Huidobro
 Aucán Huilcamán
 Alberto Hurtado
 Carlos Ibáñez del Campo
 José Miguel Insulza
 Víctor Jara
 Carlos Kaiser
 Carlos Keller
 Miguel Krasnoff
 Lady P
 Pedro Lagos
 Ricardo Lagos
 Alberto Larraguibel
 Francisco de la Lastra
 Juan José Latorre
 Lautaro (toqui)
 Joaquín Lavín
 Gustavo Leigh
 Bernardo Leighton
 Orlando Letelier
 Gonzalo Lira
 Sergio Livingstone
 Themo Lobos
 Carlos Lorca
 Margot Loyola
 Carlos Lucas
 Andrónico Luksic
 Patricio Lynch
 Juan Mackenna
 Juan Maino
 Francisco Maldonado da Silva
 Javier Margas
 Beatriz Marinello
 Juan Martinez de Rozas
 Nicolás Massú
 Roberto Matta
 Fernando Matthei
 Manfred Max-Neef
 Jorge Medina Estévez
 José Toribio Medina
 César Mendoza
 José Toribio Merino
 Michimalonco
 Milovan Mirosevic
 Paulina Mladinic
 Juan Ignacio Molina
 Juan Esteban Montero
 Christina Montt
 Jorge Montt
 Manuel Montt
 Pedro Montt
 Iván Morovic
 Heraldo Muñoz
 Mario Mutis
 Claudio Naranjo
 Francisco Nef
 Manuel Negrete (human rights victim)
 Hernán Neira
 Humberto Nilo
 Osvaldo Nunez
 Bernardo O'Higgins
 Guillermo "Willy" Oddó
 Rafael Olarra
 Víctor Olea Alegría
 Pedro Opazo
 Sergio Ortega
 José Tomás Ovalle
 Abraham Oyanedel
 Leonor Oyarzún
 Rodolfo Parada
 Ángel Parra (singer-songwriter)
 Ángel Parra Jr.
 Claudio Parra
 Colombina Parra
 Eduardo Parra
 Gabriel Parra
 Javiera Parra
 Nicanor Parra
 Santiago Pavlović
 Jorge Peña Hen
 Candelaria Perez
 José Joaquín Pérez
 Carlos Pezoa Véliz
 Rodolfo Amando Philippi
 José Piñera
 Sebastián Piñera
 Augusto Pinochet
 Aníbal Pinto
 Carlos Pinto (journalist)
 Francisco Antonio Pinto
 Manuel Plaza
 Diego Portales
 Carlos Prats
 José Joaquín Prieto Vial
 Carmen Gloria Quintana
 Carlos Reinoso
 Pedro Reyes (footballer)
 Germán Riesco Errázuriz
 Juan Antonio Ríos
 Marcelo Ríos
 Ted Robledo
 Laura Rodríguez
 Manuel Rodríguez
 Rodrigo Rojas DeNegri
 Ricardo Francisco Rojas
 Raoul Ruiz
 Marcelo Salas
 Juan Luis Sanfuentes
 Domingo Santa María
 Federico Santa María
 José Santos Ossa
 Horatio Sanz
 René Schneider
 Luis Sepúlveda
 Miguel Serrano
 Raúl Silva Henríquez
 Alejandro Silva (musician)
 Víctor Domingo Silva
 Robert Winthrop Simpson
 Antonio Skármeta
 Fernando Solis
 Juan Somavía
 Mario Benavides Soto
 Carlos Sotomayor
 Robert Souper
 Roberto Souper
 Rodolfo Stange
 Inés de Suárez
 Juan Subercaseaux
 Jonnathan Tafra
 Nelson Tapia
 Carolina Tohá
 José Tohá
 Radomiro Tomic
 Tonka Tomicic
 Rolando Toro Araneda
 Mateo de Toro y Zambrano
 Carlos Torres
 Orelie-Antoine I of Araucania and Patagonia
 Jorge Urrutia
 Matilde Urrutia
 Jorge Valdivia
 Pedro de Valdivia
 Sergio Valech
 Camilo Valenzuela
 Francisco Varela
 Leonor Varela
 Martín Vargas
 Valentina Vargas
 José María Vélaz
 Roberto Viaux
 Francisco Ramón Vicuña
 Benjamín Vicuña MacKenna
 José Antonio Vidaurre
 Benedicto Villablanca
 Ramón Vinay
 Klaus von Storch
 Gert Weil
 Juan Williams Rebolledo
 Iván Zamorano
 Manuel Ortiz de Zárate

Chilean people by occupation
 List of Chileans

Chilean astronomers
 S. Cofre
 Carlos Torres

Chilean aviators
 Dagoberto Godoy
 Klaus von Storch

Chilean biologists
 Pedro E. Maldonado
 Erik Bongcam-Rudloff
 Humberto Maturana
 Francisco Varela

Chilean boxers
 Claudio Barrientos
 Patricia Demick
 Arturo Godoy
 Carlos Lucas
 Martín Vargas
 Benedicto Villablanca

Chilean canoers
 Jonnathan Tafra

Chilean chess players
 Klaus Junge
 Beatriz Marinello
 Iván Morovic

Chilean clergy
 Alberto Hurtado
 Juan Ignacio Molina
 José María Vélaz

Chilean bishops
 Carlos Camus
 Juan Subercaseaux

Chilean cardinals
 Francisco Javier Errázuriz Ossa
 Jorge Medina Estévez
 Raúl Silva Henríquez

Chilean computer scientists
 Eric Goles

Chilean economists
 Manfred Max-Neef
 José Piñera

Chilean footballers

 Clarence Acuña
 Cristián Andrés Álvarez Valenzuela
 Pedro Araya (footballer)
 Mauricio Aros
 Rodrigo Barrera
 Eduardo Bonvallet
 Claudio Bravo
 Carlos Campos (footballer, born 1937)
 Christian Castañeda
 Nicolás Córdova
 Fernando Cornejo
 Alejandro Escalona
 Fabián Estay
 Luis Eyzaguirre
 Elías Figueroa
 Ronald Fuentes
 Patricio Galaz
 Marcos González
 Mark González
 Sebastián González
 Antonio Luis Jiménez
 Honorino Landa
 Sergio Livingstone
 Cláudio Andrés Maldonado
 Javier Margas
 Nicolás Millán
 Milovan Mirosevic
 David Moya
 Luis Musrri
 Reinaldo Navia
 Manuel Neira
 Rafael Olarra
 Sebastián Pardo
 Nelson Parraguez
 Mauricio Pinilla
 David Pizarro
 Marcelo Ramírez
 Miguel Ramírez
 Carlos Reinoso
 Pedro Reyes
 George Robledo
 Ted Robledo
 Francisco Rojas Rojas
 Ricardo Francisco Rojas
 Roberto Rojas
 Sebastián Rozental
 Rodrigo Ruiz
 Marcelo Salas
 Alexis Sánchez (monoymous footballer "Alexis")
 Leonel Sánchez
 José Luis Sierra
 Mario Benavides Soto
 Hector Tapia
 Nelson Tapia
 Carlos Tejas
 Rodrigo Tello
 Jorge Valdivia
 Rodrigo Valenzuela
 Marcelo Vega
 Moisés Villarroel
 Iván Zamorano

Chilean golfers
 Felipe Aguilar
 Nicole Perrot

Chilean heads of state
 Luis Altamirano
 Bartolomé Blanche
 Julio Canessa
 José Miguel Carrera
 Carlos Dávila
 Agustín Eyzaguirre
 Ramón Freire
 Marmaduque Grove
 Carlos Ibáñez del Campo
 Francisco de la Lastra
 Gustavo Leigh
 Juan Martinez de Rozas
 Fernando Matthei
 César Mendoza
 José Toribio Merino
 Francisco Nef
 Bernardo O'Higgins
 Augusto Pinochet
 Rodolfo Stange
 Mateo de Toro y Zambrano

Royal Governors of Chile
 Royal Governor of Chile
 Francisco de Aguirre (conquistador)
 Melchor Bravo de Saravia
 Gabriel Cano de Aponte
 Alonso García de Ramón
 Francisco Antonio García Carrasco
 Martín García Óñez de Loyola
 García Hurtado de Mendoza, Marquis of Cañete
 Francisco Laso de la Vega
 Francisco López de Zúñiga
 Casimiro Marcó del Pont
 Tomás Marín de Poveda
 Luis Merlo de la Fuente
 Ambrosio O'Higgins, Marquis of Osorno
 Domingo Ortiz de Rosas
 Mariano Osorio
 Rodrigo de Quiroga
 Alonso de Ribera
 Martín Ruiz de Gamboa
 Alonso de Sotomayor
 Mateo de Toro y Zambrano
 Pedro de Valdivia
 Francisco de Villagra
 Pedro de Villagra

Chilean historians
 Diego Barros Arana
 Francisco Antonio Encina
 Benjamín Vicuña MacKenna
 Sergio Villalobos
 Gabriel Salazar

Chilean journalists
 Carolina Aguilera
 Santiago Pavlović
 Carlos Pinto
 Fernando Solis

Chilean judges
 Juan Guzmán Tapia

Chilean mathematicians
 Eric Goles

Olympic competitors for Chile
 Marlene Ahrens
 Claudio Barrientos
 Matias Brain
 Sebastián González
 Alberto Larraguibel
 Carlos Lucas
 César Mendoza
 Reinaldo Navia
 Rafael Olarra
 David Pizarro
 Manuel Plaza
 Pedro Reyes
 Nelson Tapia
 Gert Weil
 Iván Zamorano

Olympic athletes of Chile
 Marlene Ahrens
 Manuel Plaza

Chilean ornithologists
 Juan Ignacio Molina
 Rodolfo Amando Philippi

Chilean painters
 Carlos Catasse
 Claudio Gonzalez
 Roberto Matta
 Camilo Mori
 Manuel Ortiz de Zárate
 Pedro Lira Rencoret
 Alfredo Valenzuela Puelma
 Álvaro Casanova Zenteno
 Eugenio Cruz Vargas
 Nicolás Guzmán Bustamante
 Pascual Ortega Portales
 Juan Mochi
 Alberto Valenzuela Llanos

Chilean philosophers
 Helio Gallardo
 Humberto Maturana
 Francisco Varela

Chilean photographers
 Ricardo Carrasco
 Claudio Gonzalez
 Juan Maino

Chilean physicians
 Salvador Allende
 Michelle Bachelet
 Jose Ignacio Egaña

Chilean physicists
 Claudio Bunster

Chilean poets
 Sergio Badilla Castillo
 Alberto Baeza Flores
 Elicura Chihuailaf
 Trini Decombe
 Vicente Huidobro
 Pedro Lastra
 Gabriela Mistral
 Pablo Neruda
 Nina (poet)
 Nicanor Parra
 Carlos Pezoa Véliz
 David Rosenmann-Taub
 Víctor Domingo Silva
 Eugenio Cruz Vargas

Chilean polymaths
 Gabriela Mistral

Chilean models
 Belén Montilla
 Constanza Silva
 Gabriela Barros
 Hil Hernández
 Marie Ann Salas
 Renata Ruiz
 Valentina Cárdenas

Chilean psychologists
 Claudio Naranjo
 Rolando Toro Araneda

Chilean racecar drivers
 Juan Carlos Carbonell
 Juan Zanelli

Formula One drivers from Chile
 Eliseo Salazar

Chilean tennis players
 Ricardo Acuña
 Paul Capdeville
 Jaime Fillol
 Hans Gildemeister
 Fernando González
 Anita Lizana
 Nicolás Massú
 Marcelo Ríos

Chilean triathletes
 Matias Brain

Chilean families
 Alessandri family
 Carrera family
 Cruz Family
 Frei family
 Errázuriz Family
 Montt family
 Parra family
 Vergara family

Chilean human rights victim
 Alberto Bachelet
 Charles Horman
 Víctor Jara
 Orlando Letelier
 Carlos Lorca
 Juan Maino
 Manuel Negrete (human rights victim)
 Víctor Olea Alegría
 Jorge Peña Hen
 Carmen Gloria Quintana
 Rodrigo Rojas DeNegri

Chilean people by ethnic or national origin
 List of Chilean Jews

People of Chilean descent

Chilean-Americans
 Arturo Valenzuela
 Ariel Dorfman
 Don Francisco (television host)
 Jorge Garcia
 Isabel Allende
 Nina (poet)
 Patricia Demick
 Horatio Sanz
 Alexander Witt
 Tom Araya

Chilean Argentines
 Alicia Kirchner
 Néstor Kirchner

Chilean Australians
 Rodrigo Vargas

Chilean-Canadians
 José Miguel Contreras
 Beto Cuevas
 Alberto Guerrero
 Oscar Lopez

Chilean-Mexicans
 Lucho Gatica
 Luis Gatica
 Alejandro Jodorowsky
 Carlos Reinoso
 Rodrigo Ruiz

Chilean-New Zealanders
 Marco Rojas

Chilean-Spaniards
 Alejandro Amenábar

Chilean Swedes
 Erik Bongcam-Rudloff

Chilean expatriates
 Osvaldo Nunez

Expatriates in Chile

American expatriates in Chile
 Todd Temkin

Austrian Chileans
 Miguel Krasnoff

Bolivian-Chileans
 Andrónico Luksic

Brazilian-Chileans
 Marcos González

Croatian Chileans
 Jéssica Eterovic
 Eric Goles
 Andrónico Luksic
 Milovan Mirosevic
 Paulina Mladinic
 Iván Morovic
 Leonor Oyarzún
 Santiago Pavlović
 Antonio Skármeta
 Jonnathan Tafra
 Radomiro Tomic
 Tonka Tomicic
 Néstor Kirchner
 Andrés Morales Milohnic

English-Chileans
 Jorge Edwards
 Marmaduque Grove
 Gustavo Leigh
 Bernardo Leighton
 Sergio Livingstone
 Carlos Walker Martínez
 Juan Williams Rebolledo
 George Robledo
 Ted Robledo
 Alexander Witt

French Chileans
 Bartolomé Blanche
 Alberto Fuguet
 Nicole Perrot
 Augusto Pinochet
 Roberto Viaux

German Chileans
 Marlene Ahrens
 Gustavo Becerra-Schmidt
 Erik Bongcam-Rudloff
 Hans Braumüller
 Hans Gildemeister
 Jorge González von Marées
 Oscar Hahn
 Tomás Hirsch
 Carlos Kaiser
 Sebastián Keitel
 Carlos Keller
 Mathias Klotz
 Don Francisco (television host)
 Fernando Matthei
 Rodolfo Amando Philippi
 René Schneider
 Klaus von Storch
 Gert Weil

Greek Chileans

Hungarian Chileans
 Nicolás Massú
 Antonio Horvath
 Carlos Caszely
 Mathias Vidangossy

Irish Chileans
 Patricio Aylwin
 Alberto Blest Gana
 Charlotte Lewis
 Patricio Lynch
 Juan Mackenna
 Bernardo O'Higgins
 Benjamín Vicuña MacKenna
 Andrés Wood

Italian Chileans
 Arturo Alessandri
 Jorge Alessandri
 Anacleto Angelini
 Cecilia Bolocco
 Eduardo Gatti
 Fernando González
 Beatriz Marinello
 Joaquín Toesca

Japanese Chileans
 Camilo Mori

Chilean Jews
 Ariel Dorfman
 Don Francisco (television host)
 Tomás Hirsch
 Alejandro Jodorowsky
 Francisco Maldonado da Silva
 Nicolás Massú
 Sebastián Rozental
 Volodia Teitelboim

Moldovan Chileans
 Volodia Teitelboim

Palestinian Chileans
 Miguel Littin
 Nicolás Massú

Polish-Chileans
 Ignacy Domeyko

Russian Chileans
 Alejandro Jodorowsky
 Miguel Krasnoff

Scottish Chileans
 Carlos Condell
 Alexander Cameron
 Andrés Wood

South African-Chileans
 Mark González

Spanish-Chileans
 Mark González

Swiss-Chileans
 Eduardo Frei Montalva
 Eduardo Frei Ruiz-Tagle

Ukrainian Chileans
 Volodia Teitelboim

Uruguayan Chileans
 Nelson Acosta

Chilean Freemasons
 Arturo Alessandri
 Salvador Allende
 Alberto Bachelet
 Bernardo O'Higgins

People by city in Chile

People from Chillan
 Claudio Arrau
 Ramón Vinay

LGBT people from Chile
 Raúl Ruiz

Chilean people stubs

 Abraham Oyanedel
 Alberto Bachelet
 Alberto Baeza Flores
 Alberto Fuguet
 Alberto Guerrero
 Aliro Godoy
 Álvaro Guevara
 Antonio Luis Jiménez
 Antonio Skármeta
 Arturo Alessandri
 Aucán Huilcamán
 Bartolomé Blanche
 Benjamín Vicuña MacKenna
 Bernardo Leighton
 Brenda Hughes
 Camilo Valenzuela
 Candelaria Pérez
 Carlos Campos
 Carlos Lucas
 Carlos Pinto
 Carlos Reinoso
 Carmen Gloria Quintana
 Carolina Tohá
 Caupolicán
 Christian Castañeda
 Clarence Acuña
 Claudio Barrientos
 Claudio González
 Claudio Huepe
 Claudio Naranjo
 Claudio Parra
 Claudio Valenzuela
 Clodomiro Almeyda
 Colocolo (tribal chief)
 Cristián Andrés Álvarez Valenzuela
 Dagoberto Godoy
 Diamela Eltit
 Diego Barros
 Diego Barros Arana
 Diego Portales
 Domingo Ortiz de Rosas
 Eduardo Barrios
 Eduardo Carrasco
 Emiliano Figueroa Larraín
 Fabián Estay
 Federico Errázuriz Echaurren
 Federico Errázuriz Zañartu
 Fernando Errázuriz Aldunate
 Fernando Matthei
 Fernando Solís
 Francisco Antonio Encina
 Francisco Antonio Pinto
 Francisco Coloane
 Francisco Ibáñez de Peralta
 Francisco Maldonado da Silva
 Francisco Nef
 Francisco Ruiz-Tagle
 Francisco de la Lastra
 Gabriel Cano de Aponte
 Germán Riesco
 Gonzalo Rojas
 Guillermo "Willy" Oddó
 Gustavo Leigh
 Hans Gildemeister
 Heraldo Muñoz
 Hernán Neira
 Honorino Landa
 Horacio Salinas
 Huillac Ñusca
 Humberto Maturana
 Humberto Nilo
 Iván Morovic
 Javiera Carrera
 Javiera Parra
 Joaquín Larraín Gandarillas
 Joaquín Lavín
 Jorge Medina Estévez
 Jorge Edwards
 Jorge González von Marées
 Jorge Montt
 Jorge Peña Hen
 Jorge Urrutia
 José Antonio Vidaurre
 José Donoso
 José Joaquín Pérez
 José Manuel Balmaceda
 José María Vélaz
 José Tohá
 José de Santiago Concha
 Juan Andrés de Ustariz
 Juan Emilio Cheyre
 Juan Esteban Montero
 Juan Ignacio Molina
 Juan Mackenna
 Juan Orrego-Salas
 Juan Somavía
 Julio Canessa
 Jéssica Eterovic
 Klaus von Storch
 Laura Rodríguez
 Lorenzo de Arrau
 Lucía Hiriart de Pinochet
 Luis Altamirano
 Luis Carrera
 Luis Musrri
 Luisa Durán
 Manfred Max-Neef
 Manuel Blanco Encalada
 Manuel Bulnes
 Manuel Montt
 Manuel Neira
 Manuel Plaza
 Marco Bechis
 Mario Mutis
 Marlene Ahrens
 Matilde Urrutia
 Mauricio Aros
 Miguel Krasnoff
 Milovan Mirosevic
 Máximo Carvajal
 Nicanor Parra
 Nicolás Córdova
 Nina (poet)
 Osvaldo Andrade
 Patricio Contreras
 Patricio Galaz
 Paul Delano
 Paulina Mladinic
 Pedro Aguirre Cerda
 Pedro Araya (footballer)
 Pedro Espinoza Bravo
 Pedro Lastra
 Pedro Montt
 Pedro Opazo
 Ramón Barros Luco
 Raúl Silva Henríquez
 Ricardo Acuña
 Ricardo Francisco Rojas
 Roberto Castillo Sandoval
 Roberto Souper
 Rodolfo Amando Philippi
 Rodolfo Parada
 Rodolfo Stange
 Rodrigo Barrera
 Rolando Toro Araneda
 Santiago Pavlović
 Sebastián Rozental
 Sergio Livingstone
 Sergio Valech
 Template:Chile-bio-stub
 Themo Lobos
 Tito Beltrán
 Tomás Hirsch
 Tomás Marín de Poveda
 Tonka Tomicic
 Violeta Parra
 Virgilio Paz Romero
 Vittorio Corbo
 Víctor Domingo Silva
 Víctor Olea Alegría

Politics of Chile
 Abortion in Chile
 Chile under Allende
 Chile under Pinochet
 Chilean political scandals
 Electoral division of Chile
 Manuel Rodríguez Patriotic Front
 List of Government Juntas of Chile
 Liberalism and radicalism in Chile
 Chilean nationalization of copper
 Politics of Chile
 President of Chile

Political parties in Chile
 List of political parties in Chile
 Alliance for Chile
 Chilean Communist Party (Proletarian Action)
 Christian Democrat Party of Chile
 Christian Left Party (Chile)
 Coalition of Parties for Democracy
 Communist Party of Chile
 Green Party of Chile
 Humanist Party (Chile)
 Independent Democrat Union
 Juntos Podemos Más
 National Alliance of Independents
 National Party (Chile)
 National Renewal (Chile)
 National Socialist Movement of Chile
 Party for Democracy
 People's Revolutionary Party (Chile)
 Popular Unity
 Progressive Union of the Centrist Center
 Radical Democracy Party (Chile)
 Regionalist Action Party of Chile
 Revolutionary Communist Party (Chile)
 Revolutionary Left Movement (Chile)
 Social Democrat Radical Party
 Socialist Party of Chile

Chilean politicians

 Arturo Alessandri
 Jorge Alessandri
 Isabel Allende Bussi
 Andrés Pascal Allende
 Salvador Allende
 Clodomiro Almeyda
 Carlos Altamirano
 Soledad Alvear
 Osvaldo Andrade
 Patricio Aylwin
 Michelle Bachelet
 Abdón Cifuentes
 Carlos Dávila
 Miguel Enríquez Espinosa
 Federico Errázuriz Echaurren
 Francisco Javier Errázuriz Talavera
 Fernando Flores
 Eduardo Frei Montalva
 Eduardo Frei Ruiz-Tagle
 Jorge González von Marées
 Marmaduque Grove
 Tomás Hirsch
 Claudio Huepe
 Aucán Huilcamán
 José Miguel Insulza
 Carlos Keller
 Ricardo Lagos
 Joaquín Lavín
 Bernardo Leighton
 Orlando Letelier
 Carlos Lorca
 Gladys Marín
 Manfred Max-Neef
 Heraldo Muñoz
 Abraham Oyanedel
 José Piñera
 Sebastián Piñera
 Augusto Pinochet
 Diego Portales
 Carlos Prats
 Laura Rodríguez
 Sonia Tschorne
 Volodia Teitelboim
 Carolina Tohá
 José Tohá
 Radomiro Tomic
 Adolfo Zaldívar
 Andrés Zaldívar

Presidents of Chile

 President of Chile
 Pedro Aguirre Cerda
 Arturo Alessandri
 Jorge Alessandri
 Salvador Allende
 Patricio Aylwin
 Michelle Bachelet
 José Manuel Balmaceda
 Ramón Barros Luco
 Manuel Blanco Encalada
 Manuel Bulnes
 Carlos Dávila
 Federico Errázuriz Echaurren
 Federico Errázuriz Zañartu
 Fernando Errázuriz Aldunate
 Agustín Eyzaguirre
 Elías Fernández Albano
 Emiliano Figueroa Larraín
 Eduardo Frei Montalva
 Eduardo Frei Ruiz-Tagle
 Ramón Freire
 Gabriel González Videla
 Carlos Ibáñez del Campo
 Ricardo Lagos
 Juan Esteban Montero
 Jorge Montt
 Manuel Montt
 Pedro Montt
 Pedro Opazo
 José Tomás Ovalle y Bezanilla
 Abraham Oyanedel
 José Joaquín Pérez
 Sebastián Piñera
 Augusto Pinochet
 Aníbal Pinto
 Francisco Antonio Pinto
 José Joaquín Prieto
 Germán Riesco Errázuriz
 Juan Antonio Ríos
 Francisco Ruiz-Tagle Portales
 Juan Luis Sanfuentes
 Domingo Santa María González
 Francisco Ramón Vicuña Larraín

Chilean communists
 Luis Corvalán
 Víctor Jara
 Gladys Marín
 Pablo Neruda
 Violeta Parra

Supreme Directors of Chile
 José Miguel Carrera
 Ramón Freire
 Francisco de la Lastra
 Bernardo O'Higgins

Provinces of Chile
 Provinces of Chile
 Antártica Chilena Province
 Antofagasta Province
 Arica Province
 Biobío Province
 Cardenal Caro Province
 Cauquenes Province
 Cautín Province
 Chacabuco Province
 Chiloé Province
 Colchagua Province
 Cordillera Province, Chile
 Curicó Province
 Iquique Province
 Isla Navarino
 Linares Province
 Llanquihue Province
 Maipo Province
 Ñuble Province
 Osorno Province
 Palena Province
 Parinacota Province
 Province of Los Andes, Chile
 Santiago Province (Chile)
 Talca Province
 Tierra del Fuego Province, Chile
 Última Esperanza Province
 Valdivia Province

Llanquihue Province
 Frutillar
 Puerto Montt
 Puerto Varas

Última Esperanza Province
 Última Esperanza Province
 Cerro Chaltén
 Cerro Torre
 Cordillera del Paine
 Magallanes y la Antártica Chilena Region
 Puerto Natales
 Southern Patagonian Ice Field

Regions of Chile
 Regions of Chile
 Antofagasta Region
 Araucanía Region
 Arica-Parinacota Region
 Atacama Region
 Aisén Region
 Bío-Bío Region
 Coquimbo Region
 Los Lagos Region
 Los Ríos Region
 Magallanes y la Antártica Chilena Region
 Maule Region
 O'Higgins Region
 Santiago Metropolitan Region
 Tarapacá Region
 Valparaíso Region
 Wikipedia:WikiProject Countries/Templates/Navboxes

Bío-Bío Region
 Arauco Province
 Biobío Province
 Biotren
 Biobío Province
 Bío-Bío Region
 Bío-Bío River
 Chillán
 Club Deportivo Ferroviario Almirante Arturo Fernández Vial
 Cobquecura
 Concepción, Chile
 Laja Falls
 Laja River (Chile)
 Los Ángeles
 Ñuble Province (1974–2018)
 Penco
 Talcahuano
 Universidad Católica de la Santísima Concepción
 Universidad San Sebastián
 Universidad de Concepción
 Universidad del Bío-Bío

Municipalities of Chile

 La Calera
 Lo Barnechea
 El Bosque (municipality, Chile)
 Cerrillos (municipality)
 Cerro Navia
 Chanco (Chile)
 La Cisterna
 Colbún
 Las Condes
 Conchalí
 Corral
 Curacautin
 Empedrado, Talca
 Lo Espejo
 Estación Central
 La Florida, Chile
 La Granja (municipality)
 Huechuraba
 Independencia (municipality, Chile)
 Linares, Chile
 Longaví
 Macul
 Maipú (municipality)
 Ñuñoa
 Parral, Chile
 Pedro Aguirre Cerda (municipality)
 Pelluhue
 Pencahue
 Peñalolén
 La Pintana
 Lo Prado
 Providencia (municipality, Chile)
 Pudahuel
 Quilicura
 Quinta Normal
 Recoleta (municipality)
 La Reina
 Renca
 Retiro, Chile
 San Fabián
 San Javier, Chile
 San Joaquín
 San Miguel (municipality)
 San Ramón, Chile
 Santiago (municipality)
 Villa Alegre, Chile
 Vitacura
 Yerbas Buenas

Religion in Chile
 Islam in Chile
 Roman Catholicism in Chile

Roman Catholic dioceses in Chile

 Archdiocese of Antofagasta
 Diocese of Arica
 Diocese of Iquique
 Territorial Prelature of Calama
 Archdiocese of Concepción, Chile (created as Diócesis de La Santísima Concepción)
 Diocese of Chillán
 Roman Catholic Diocese of Los Ángeles
 Diocese of Temuco
 Diocese of Villarrica
 Diocese of Valdivia
 Archdiocese of La Serena
 Diocese of Copiapó
 Territorial Prelature of Illapel
 Archdiocese of Santiago de Chile
 Diocese of San Felipe
 Diocese of Valparaíso
 Diocese of Melipilla
 Diocese of San Bernardo
 Diocese of Rancagua
 Diocese of Talca
 Diocese of Linares, Chile
 Archdiocese of Puerto Montt
 Diocese of Osorno
 Diocese of San Carlos de Ancud
 Diocese of Punta Arenas
 Apostolic Vicariate of Aysén
 Diocese for the Military Services (Obispado Castrense)

Science and technology in Chile
 Atacama Submillimeter Telescope Experiment
 Cetacean Conservation Center
 European Southern Observatory
 Very Large Telescope

Chilean scientists

"See also: Chilean biochemists"

Ships of Chile

World War I ships of Chile

World War II ships of Chile

Chilean society
 Asociación de Guías y Scouts de Chile
 Demographics of Chile
 Huaso
 Mapuche
 Public holidays in Chile

Ethnic groups in Chile
 Alacalufe people
 Austronesian people
 Aymara people
 Diaguita
 Mapuche
 Rapanui
 Selknam

Mapuche
 Caupolican
 Colocolo (tribal chief)
 Huilliche
 Lautaro (toqui)
 Mapuche
 Picunche
 Toqui

Mapudungu
 Huillice language
 Mapudungun

Sport in Chile
 Chile at the 2006 Winter Paralympics
 Chile national rugby union team
 Chilean rodeo
 Surfing in Chile

Basketball in Chile
 Chile national basketball team
 1932 South American Basketball Championship
 1937 South American Basketball Championship
 1942 South American Basketball Championship

Sports festivals hosted in Chile
 1962 FIFA World Cup

1962 FIFA World Cup
 1962 FIFA World Cup
 Battle of Santiago
 1962 FIFA World Cup qualification
 1962 FIFA World Cup squads

1962 FIFA World Cup players

 Jozef Adamec
 Adelardo Rodríguez
 Flórián Albert
 Enrico Albertosi
 José Altafini
 Altair Gomes de Figueiredo
 Amarildo
 Stan Anderson
 Jimmy Armfield
 Georgi Asparuhov
 Gordon Banks
 Hilderaldo Bellini
 Jozef Bomba
 Albert Brülls
 Lorenzo Buffon
 Giacomo Bulgarelli
 Carlos Campos
 Antonio Carbajal
 Carlos José Castilho
 Bobby Charlton
 Igor Chislenko
 John Connelly (footballer, born 1938)
 Luís Cubilla
 Mario David (footballer)
 Alfredo Di Stéfano
 Valdir Pereira
 Djalma Santos
 Bryan Douglas
 George Eastham
 Herbert Erhardt
 Luis Eyzaguirre
 Ron Flowers
 Milan Galić
 Garrincha
 Francisco Gento
 Gilmar
 Jimmy Greaves
 Gyula Grosics
 Helmut Haller
 Johnny Haynes
 Gerry Hitchens
 Alan Hodgkinson
 Don Howe
 Roger Hunt
 Valentin Ivanov
 Josef Jelínek
 Dražan Jerković
 Josef Kadraba
 Derek Kevan
 Andrej Kvašňák
 Jan Lála
 Honorino Landa
 Cesare Maldini
 Eulogio Martínez
 Silvio Marzolini
 Humberto Maschio
 Václav Mašek
 Josef Masopust
 Mauro Ramos
 Bobby Moore
 Nílton Santos
 Maurice Norman
 Ladislav Novák
 Alan Peacock
 Joaquín Peiró
 Pelé
 José Macia
 Svatopluk Pluskal
 Viktor Ponedelnik
 Ján Popluhár
 Ferenc Puskás
 Antonio Rattín
 Severino Reija
 Gianni Rivera
 Bobby Robson
 Antonio Roma
 Leonel Sánchez
 José Santamaría
 Hans Schäfer
 Adolf Scherer
 Heinz Schneiter
 Karl-Heinz Schnellinger
 Viliam Schrojf
 Uwe Seeler
 Dragoslav Šekularac
 Omar Sivori
 Josip Skoblar
 Ron Springett
 Luis Suárez Miramontes
 Peter Swan
 Horst Szymaniak
 Ely Tacchella
 Lajos Tichy
 Hans Tilkowski
 Giovanni Trapattoni
 Horacio Troche
 Vavá
 Ray Wilson (footballer)
 Rolf Wüthrich
 Dimitar Yakimov
 Lev Yashin
 Mário Zagallo
 José Ely de Miranda
 Zózimo

FIFA World Cup 1962 managers
 Lajos Baróti
 Giovanni Ferrari
 Sepp Herberger
 Helenio Herrera
 Juan Carlos Lorenzo
 Aymoré Moreira
 Adolfo Pedernera
 Walter Winterbottom

1962 FIFA World Cup Squad Templates
 Template:Argentina squad 1962 FIFA World Cup
 Template:Brazil squad 1962 FIFA World Cup
 Template:West Germany squad 1962 FIFA World Cup
 Template:Italy squad 1962 FIFA World Cup

Football in Chile
 Chile national football team
 Chile national under-20 football team
 Chile national under-17 football team
 1962 FIFA World Cup
 Ballet Azul
 Battle of Santiago
 Federación de Fútbol de Chile
 Chilean football league system
 Liga Chilena de Fútbol: Primera División
 Los de Abajo

Chilean football clubs
 Club de Deportes Antofagasta
 Audax Club Sportivo Italiano
 Cobreloa
 Club Deportes Cobresal
 Colo-Colo
 Coquimbo Unido
 Corporación Deportiva Everton de Viña del Mar
 Club Deportivo Huachipato
 Club de Deportes La Serena
 Club Deportivo O'Higgins
 Club Deportivo Palestino
 Club de Deportes Puerto Montt
 Club Social de Deportes Rangers de Talca
 Club de Deportes Santiago Morning
 Club de Deportes Santiago Wanderers
 Club Deportivo Universidad Católica
 Club Deportivo Universidad de Concepción
 Universidad de Chile (football club)
 Unión Española

Footballers in Chile by club

Universidad de Chile players
 Clarence Acuña
 Mauricio Aros
 Faustino Asprilla
 Richard Báez
 Carlos Campos
 Christian Castañeda
 Luis Eyzaguirre
 Ronald Fuentes
 Patricio Galaz
 Marcos González
 Luis Musrri
 Rafael Olarra
 Sebastián Pardo
 Manuel Pellegrini
 Mauricio Pinilla
 David Pizarro
 Jorge Quinteros
 Pedro Reyes
 Ricardo Francisco Rojas
 Marcelo Salas
 Leonel Sánchez
 Rodrigo Tello
 Rodrigo Valenzuela
 Marcelo Vega

Chilean football managers
 Nelson Acosta
 Manuel Pellegrini

Chile national football team templates
 Template:Chile squad 1998 FIFA World Cup

Chile at the Olympics
 Chile at the 1928 Summer Olympics
 Chile at the 1936 Summer Olympics
 Chile at the 1948 Summer Olympics
 Chile at the 1952 Summer Olympics
 Chile at the 1956 Summer Olympics
 Chile at the 1960 Summer Olympics
 Chile at the 1964 Summer Olympics
 Chile at the 1968 Summer Olympics
 Chile at the 1972 Summer Olympics
 Chile at the 1976 Summer Olympics
 Chile at the 1984 Summer Olympics
 Chile at the 1988 Summer Olympics
 Chile at the 1992 Summer Olympics
 Chile at the 1996 Summer Olympics
 Chile at the 2000 Summer Olympics
 Chile at the 2004 Summer Olympics
 Chile at the 2006 Winter Olympics

Olympic tennis players of Chile
 Fernando González
 Nicolás Massú
 Marcelo Ríos

Chilean sportspeople

Chilean athletes
 Marlene Ahrens
 Sebastián Keitel
 Manuel Plaza
 Gert Weil

Chilean equestrians
 Alberto Larraguibel
 César Mendoza
 Oscar Cristi
 Gabriel Donoso
 José A. Santos
 Ramón Cardemil

Chilean field hockey players
 Veronica Planella

Tourism in Chile

Airlines of Chile
 Aero Cardal
 Aerovías DAP
 Alpine Air Express Chile
 LAN Airlines
 LAN Chile Cargo
 LANExpress
 Ladeco
 Sky Airline

Visitor attractions in Chile

Transportation in Chile

Roads
 List of expressways in Chile
 List of highways in Chile

Buses

 Transantiago

Mountain passes
 List of mountain passes of Chile

Subways
 Santiago Metro
 List of Valparaíso metro stations
 Metrotrén

Trains
 Biotren
 FC Caleta Coloso a Aguas Blancas
 FC de Junin
 Ferrocarril de Antofagasta a Bolivia

Aviation in Chile

Aircraft manufactured by Chile

Chilean aircraft 1990-1999

LATAM Airlines
 ABSA - Aerolinhas Brasileiras
 LATAM Airlines
 LATAM Airlines destinations
 LAN Chile Cargo
 LATAM Ecuador
 LATAM Peru
 LANExpress

Water transport in Chile

Chile stubs

 ARTV (Chile)
 Abortion in Chile
 Aero Cardal
 Almirante Condell
 Almirante Lynch
 Alpine Air Express Chile
 Arena Santiago
 Baltimore Crisis
 First Battle of Cancha Rayada
 Second Battle of Cancha Rayada
 Battle of Pisagua
 Battle of San Francisco
 Battle of Tarapacá
 Battle of Topáter
 Slit throats case
 Bombardment of Callao
 CDtv
 Canal 13 (Chile)
 Canal del Fútbol (Chile)
 Carretera Austral
 Cetacean Conservation Center
 Chile at the 1928 Summer Olympics
 Chile at the 1936 Summer Olympics
 Chile at the 1948 Summer Olympics
 Chile at the 1952 Summer Olympics
 Chile at the 1956 Summer Olympics
 Chile at the 1960 Summer Olympics
 Chile at the 1964 Summer Olympics
 Chile at the 1968 Summer Olympics
 Chile at the 1972 Summer Olympics
 Chile at the 1976 Summer Olympics
 Chile at the 1984 Summer Olympics
 Chile at the 1992 Summer Olympics
 Chile at the 2006 Winter Paralympics
 Chilean Council of State
 Chilean battleship Almirante Latorre
 
 Chilean destroyer Aldea (1928)
 1925 Chilean presidential election
 Chilean rodeo
 Chilevisión
 Compañía Chilena de Televisión
 Corral
 Costanera Center
 Cruz del Tercer Milenio
 DINA
 Diocese of La Santísima Concepción
 Disaster of Rancagua
 Distribución y Servicio
 El Siglo (Chile)
 Entel
 Estadio Carlos Dittborn
 Estadio El Cobre
 Estadio El Teniente
 Estadio Fiscal
 Estadio Francisco Sánchez Rumoroso
 Estadio La Portada
 Estadio Las Higueras
 Estadio Monumental David Arellano
 Estadio Municipal de Calama
 Estadio Municipal de Concepción
 Estadio Municipal de La Florida
 Estadio Playa Ancha
 Estadio Regional de Antofagasta
 Estadio Regional de Chinquihue
 Estadio San Carlos de Apoquindo
 Estadio Santa Laura
 Estadio Santiago Bueras
 Estadio Sausalito
 Etc...TV
 Fatherland and Liberty
 Gondwana (Chilean band)
 Guaraculén
 Huaso
 Huilliche
 Humberstone and Santa Laura Saltpeter Works
 Ignacio Carrera Pinto
 Instituto Nacional
 Jaime Guzmán
 Kudai
 La Negra Antofagasta
 La Prensa de Curicó
 La Tercera
 Las Últimas Noticias
 Liberal Party of Chile
 List of Chilean companies
 Los Ríos Region
 Lucybell
 Manuel Rodríguez Patriotic Front
 Medialuna
 National Women's Service
 Operation Colombo
 Party for Democracy
 Picunche
 Plaza de la Ciudadanía
 Putagán
 Radio Cooperativa
 Red Televisiva Megavisión
 Rettig Report
 Rodrigo Rojas DeNegri
 Rojasfilms
 S. Cofre
 Saavedra, Chile
 San Fernando, Chile
 Santiago College
 Serrano class destroyer
 Sex and Pornography Day
 TV Senado
 TVU (Chile)
 Telecanal
 Template:Chile-stub
 The Grange School, Santiago
 The House of the Spirits (film)
 The Road to Maipo
 Tierra del Fuego Province, Chile
 Tocopilla
 UCV TV
 Unidad Anti-Terrorista
 Universidad Alberto Hurtado
 Universidad Arturo Prat
 Universidad Austral de Chile
 Universidad Católica de Temuco
 Universidad Católica de la Santísima Concepción
 Universidad Católica del Maule
 Universidad Católica del Norte
 Universidad Gabriela Mistral
 Universidad Metropolitana de Ciencias de la Educación
 Universidad San Sebastián
 Universidad Tecnológica Metropolitana
 Universidad de Antofagasta
 Universidad de Artes, Ciencias y Comunicación
 Universidad de La Frontera
 Universidad de La Serena
 Universidad de Los Lagos
 Universidad de Magallanes
 Universidad de Playa Ancha de Ciencias de la Educación
 Universidad de Talca
 Universidad de Tarapacá
 Universidad de Valparaíso
 Universidad del Bío-Bío
 University of Santiago, Chile
 VTR Globalcom
 Via X
 Visviri
 Wallatiri
 Williamson-Balfour Company
 Wisetrack
 Zona Latina
 Óptima Televisión
 Última Esperanza Province

Other
 
 Hiking in Chile
 Asociación de Guías y Scouts de Chile
 Chile Antarctic Geopolitics
 Communications in Chile
 Economic history of Chile
 Education in Chile
 Elections in Chile
 Foreign relations of Chile
 Holidays in Chile
 Human rights in Chile
 ISO 3166-2:CL
 Law of Chile
 List of Chilean companies
 List of Chilean television channels
 List of Chileans
 SURES
 Transport in Chile
 United Nations
 U.S. intervention in Chile
 Water supply and sanitation in Chile

See also

List of international rankings
Lists of country-related topics
Outline of geography
Outline of South America
United Nations

External links

 
Outlines of countries

ja:チリ関係記事の一覧